The principal private secretary to the secretary of state for foreign and Commonwealth affairs is the head of the private office of the foreign minister of the His Majesty's Government, and is located in the Foreign and Commonwealth Office Main Building.

History
At the start of the 19th century, the foreign secretary would have had one or two private secretaries, who were often personal appointments of the office-holder. As the complexity of British foreign policy grew significantly, and consequently the size of the private office expanded to provide policy and administrative support; the chief civil servant in the private office became the principal private secretary. Today, he or she is the head of a small department, and the post is a senior and prestigious one, now typically held for a two-year term by an experienced officer from the Diplomatic Service.

The post is director grade equivalent in the Civil Service (SCS2), and also equivalent to a rear admiral in the Royal Navy and major general in the British Army. Holders of the post often go on to hold some of the most senior ambassador posts overseas, and also often honoured with a knighthood.

This list below shows holders' names as they were at the time of holding the post; details of their later careers and honours can be found in individual articles. In addition, the list includes holders of the posts of private secretary to the secretary of state for foreign affairs and then principal private secretary to the secretary of state for foreign affairs (1822-1968). The office of secretary of state for foreign and Commonwealth affairs was created in 1968, by the merger of the Foreign Office and the Commonwealth Office's secretary of state's offices.

Principal private secretaries 

1822: George Seymour
1822–1824: Lord George Bentinck
1824–1827: Augustus Stapleton
1827–1830: Digby Wrangham
1830–1833: John Walpole
1833–1834: Stephen Sulivan
1834–1835: Algernon Greville
1835–1840: Charles Cowper
1840–1841: James Howard
1841–1846: Clinton Dawkins
1846–1852: Spencer Ponsonby
1852: George Harris
1852–1853: Arthur Russell
1853–1857: Spencer Ponsonby (Second term)
1857–1858: Villiers Lister
1858–1859: John Bidwell
1859–1865: George Elliot
1865–1866: Villiers Lister (Second term)
1866–1868: Thomas Sanderson
1868–1870: Villiers Lister (Third term)
1870–1871: Robert Meade
1871–1874: Thomas Wetherell
1874–1878: Thomas Sanderson (Second term)
1878–1880: Philip Currie
1880–1885: Thomas Sanderson (Third term)
1885–1886: Eric Barrington
1886: Francis Hyde Villiers
1886–1892: Eric Barrington (Second term)
1892–1894: Francis Hyde Villiers (Second term)
1894–1895: Armine Wodehouse
1895–1905: Sir Eric Barrington (Third term)
1906–1907: Louis du Pan Mallet
1907–1915: Sir William Tyrrell
1915–1919: Sir Eric Drummond
1920–1924: Robert Vansittart
1924–1932: Sir Walford Selby
1932–1935: Horace Seymour
1936–1939: Oliver Harvey
1939–1941: Ralph Stevenson
1941–1943: Oliver Harvey (Second term)
1943–1947: Pierson Dixon
1947–1949: Frank Roberts
1949–1951: Roderick Barclay
1951–1954: Evelyn Shuckburgh
1954–1955: Sir Anthony Rumbold
1955–1956: Patrick Hancock
1956–1959: Denis Laskey
1959–1963: Ian Samuel
1963: Oliver Wright
1963–1965: Nicholas Henderson
1965–1967: Murray MacLehose
1967–1969: Donald Maitland
1969–1972: John Graham
1972–1975: Antony Acland
1975: Stephen Barrett
1975–1978: Ewen Fergusson
1978–1981: George Walden
1981–1984: Brian Fall
1984–1986: Leonard Appleyard
1986–1988: Anthony Galsworthy
1988–1990: Stephen Wall
1990–1993: Richard Gozney
1993–1995: John Sawers
1995–1997: William Ehrman
1997–1999: John Grant
1999–2001: Sherard Cowper-Coles
2001–2003: Simon McDonald
2003–2005: Geoffrey Adams
2005–2007: Peter Hayes
2007–2010: Matthew Gould
2010–2012: Lindsay Croisdale-Appleby
2012–2014: Thomas Drew
2014–2018: Martin Reynolds
January–June 2018: Jonathan Sinclair
June 2018–April 2019: Serena Stone 
June 2019 -January 2021: Susannah Goshko
January 2021 – present: Nick Catsaras

See also 

 Principal Private Secretary to the Prime Minister of the United Kingdom
Private Secretary for Foreign Affairs to the Prime Minister

References

External links 
Mackie, Colin (2016) 

Lists of office-holders in the United Kingdom
Civil service positions in the United Kingdom
Foreign relations of the United Kingdom